Yoshitoki Ōima debuted To Your Eternity in issue #50 of Kodansha's shōnen manga magazine Weekly Shōnen Magazine on November 9, 2016. The manga was announced on May 23, 2016. It is Ōima's second series in Weekly Shōnen Magazine; her first series was the critically acclaimed A Silent Voice. The story follows an immortal being, Fushi, who arrives on the Earth and takes the form of an abandoned young villager and his wolf.

The series' first arc finished on December 4, 2019, while the second arc started on January 22, 2020. An anime television series adaptation by Brain's Base premiered on April 12, 2021.

On  January 17, 2017, Kodansha USA announced that they would digitally publish the first ten chapters of the series on various digital platforms. Thereafter, they will publish the manga's new chapters simultaneously  with the Japanese release. The first printed volume in North America was released on October 31, 2017.

Volume list

|}

Chapters not yet in tankōbon format
These chapters have yet to be published in a tankōbon volume.
 166. 
 167. 
 168. 
 169.

References

To Your Eternity